Companhia Itaú de Transportes Aéreos was a Brazilian airline founded in 1947. In 1955 it was sold to Transportes Aéreos Nacional, which incorporated the airline the following year.

History
Itaú was founded on September 30, 1947 as a subsidiary of the producer of cement Itaú and dedicated exclusively to the transportation of cargo. Operations started in 1948. In October 1955, suffering from the losses of some aircraft due to accidents, Itaú was sold to Transportes Aéreos Nacional. In 1956 Nacional incorporated the airline.

Destinations
In 1950 Itaú served the following cities:  
Belo Horizonte
Campo Grande
Fortaleza
Recife
Rio de Janeiro
Salvador da Bahia
São Paulo

Fleet

Accidents and incidents
20 August 1953: a Curtiss C-46A-60-CK Commando registration PP-ITD crashed and caught fire during an emergency landing at Corumbá. Three crew members died and one survived.
3 April 1955: a Curtiss C-46A-60-CK Commando registration PP-ITG struck a hill 2 miles short of the runway while on an instrument approach to Vitória. The crew of 3 died.

See also
List of defunct airlines of Brazil

References

External links
Itaú accidents as per Aviation Safety Database

Defunct airlines of Brazil
Airlines established in 1947
Airlines disestablished in 1956
1947 establishments in Brazil
1956 disestablishments in Brazil
1956 mergers and acquisitions